Statue of William III may refer to:
 Equestrian statue of William III, Bristol
 Equestrian statue of William III, Glasgow
 Equestrian statue of William III, London
 Statue of William III, Brixham
 Statue of William III, Kensington Palace